Keerthisiri Fernando (born 5 May 1961) is the sixth Bishop of Kurunegala, Sri Lanka.

Wannakuwatte Mitiwaduge Devapriya Keerthisiri Fernando was born in Colombo on 5 May 1961, the son of David Fernando and Neeta Perera. Fernando attended the Prince of Wales' College, Moratuwa, from 1967 to 1980.

In 1989, Fernando received his Bachelor of Theology from the University of Serampore in India. He was subsequently ordained as a priest in Church of Ceylon on 30 November 1990. In 1993 he obtained a Bachelor of Divinity from University of Serampore. From 1996 to 2010 he served in various positions at the Theological College of Lanka in Pilimatalawa. In 2001 he received a Master of Philosophy (Sociology with theological implications) from the University of Ruhuna in Sri Lanka and in 2005 he received a Master of Philosophy (Theology and Sociology of Religion) from the University of Kent.

In 1996, he was posted to the Theological College of Lanka, Pilimatalawa as a lecturer. He served as Chaplain, Director of Field Education until 2010 and as Acting Principal. In 2011 he became the incumbent of the Holy Emmanuel Church, Moratuwa and in 2015 he was assigned to St. Francis of Assisi, Mount Lavinia. On 29 April 2016 he was installed as the 5th Archdeacon of Nuwara Eliya.

On 21 September 2017, he was elected to the position of Bishop of Kurunegala. On 6 January 2018 he was ordained as the 6th Bishop of Kurunegala at the Cathedral of Christ the King, Kurunegala.

In December 2020, the Archbishop of Canterbury appointed him as the Presiding Bishop of the Church of Ceylon.

On 17 May 2022, he received a Doctor of Divinity from St Andrew's Theological University in India.

On 24 September 2022, he announced his resignation as bishop, citing personal reasons. The Archbishop of Canterbury appointed him as Acting Bishop until a replacement is made.

Bibliography
 
 
 
Fernando, Keerthisiri (2019). Ethno-Religious Identities. Theological College of Lanka, Pilimathalawa
Fernando, Keerthisiri with Rasika  Abeysinghe (2018). Christian Worship and Liturgy. Diocese of Kurunagala, Church of Ceylon

See also 
Church of Ceylon
Bishop of Kurunegala

References 

 https://www.anglicancommunion.org/structures/member-churches/member-church/diocese/position.aspx?church=ceylon&dio=kurunegala&pos=primate-of-the-church-of-ceylon-and-bishop-of-kurunegala&posID=19823

 https://www.leeds.anglican.org/news/international-welcome-new-sri-lankan-bishop

 
https://www.dkeerthi.com

External links 
 The Church of Ceylon (Anglican Communion)
 Anglican Church of Ceylon News
 Diocese of Kuunegala

1961 births
20th-century Anglican bishops in Asia
Alumni of Prince of Wales' College, Moratuwa
Alumni of the University of Kent
Alumni of the University of Ruhuna
Anglican bishops of Kurunegala
Living people
Senate of Serampore College (University) alumni
Sinhalese priests